Amapola is Spanish for "poppy", meaning the genus Papaver

Amapola may also refer to:

 "Amapola" (song), a 1920 song written by Joseph Lacalle
 Amapola (film), a 2014 Argentine-American romantic comedy fantasy film
 Amapola Flyg, a regional airline based in Stockholm, Sweden
 Maria Amapola Cabase (born 1948), Filipino singer and actress, stage name Amapola
 La Amapola (born 1976), ring name of Guadalupe Ramona Olvera, Mexican professional wrestler

Spanish words and phrases